NEET, an acronym for "Not in Education, Employment, or Training", refers to a person who is unemployed and not receiving an education or vocational training.  The classification originated in the United Kingdom in the late 1990s, and its use has spread, in varying degrees, to other countries, including Japan, South Korea, China, Taiwan, Canada, and the United States. The NEET category includes the unemployed (individuals without a job and seeking one), as well as individuals outside the labour force (without a job and not seeking one). It is usually age-bounded to exclude people in old-age retirement.

In the United Kingdom, the classification comprises people aged between 16 and 24 (some 16 and 17 year-olds are still of compulsory school age); the subgroup of NEETs aged 16–18 is frequently of particular focus. In Japan, the classification comprises people aged between 15 and 34 who are not employed, not engaged in housework, not enrolled in school or work-related training, and not seeking work.

A 2008 report by the Organisation for Economic Co-operation and Development (OECD) said the unemployment and NEET rates for people aged 16–24 in the majority of OECD countries fell in the past decade, attributed to increased participation in education.

NEET is to be distinguished from the newly coined NLFET rate ("Neither in the Labour Force nor in Education or Training") used in the 2013 report on Global Employment Trends for Youth by the International Labour Organization. NLFET is similar to NEET but excludes unemployed youth (who are part of the labour force).

United Kingdom

Knowledge of the word spread after it was used in a 1999 report by the Social Exclusion Unit (SEU). Before this, the phrase "status zero", which had a similar meaning, was used. Andy Furlong writes that the use of the term NEET became popular partly because of the negative connotations of having "no status". The classification is specifically redefined in other local government papers, such as "respondents who were out of work or looking for a job, looking after children or family members, on unpaid holiday or traveling, sick or disabled, doing voluntary work or engaged in another unspecified activity"; the acronym, however, has no agreed definition with respect to measurement, particularly in relation to defining economic inactivity. Karen Robson writes that the classification has "virtually usurped discussions of "youth unemployment" in the UK literature". Scott Yates and Malcolm Payne say that initially there was a "holistic focus" on the NEET group by policy-makers which looked at the problems young people went through, but this changed as the NEET status became framed in negative terms—"as reflective of a raft of risks, problems and negative orientations on the part of young people". NEET figures for England are published by the Department for Education (DfE). The methodology used in calculating the number of NEETs aged 16–18 is different from that used for those aged 16–24. The first relies on a range of sources, the second on the Labour Force Survey.

A 2007 report commissioned by the Prince's Trust said almost a fifth of people aged 16–24 in England, Scotland, and Wales were NEETs; the proportion was lowest in Northern Ireland (13.8 percent). The second-quarter figures for 2011 showed that 979,000 people in England between 16 and 24 were NEETs, accounting for 16.2 percent in that age group. Between 1995 and 2008, the proportion of NEETs aged 16–18 in England remained fairly stable at around 8–11 percent. The Guardian reported in 2011 that, since 2003, there has been a 15.6 percent decrease in people aged 16–18 in employment, but a 6.8 percent increase in those in education and training. NEET figures tend to peak in the third quarter, when school and university courses are ending.

There is some stigma attached to the term NEET. Simon Cox of BBC News said the word is "the latest buzzword for teenage drop-outs". He says "Neets are 20 times more likely to commit a crime and 22 times more likely to be a teenage mum", and that Barking and Dagenham has been called the country's "Neet capital". David Smith of The Times calls them "the yobs hanging around off-licences late into the night". According to Colin Webster, NEETs commit disproportionately large amounts of crime. Children with high levels of truancy and exclusions at school are likely to become NEETs.

Several schemes and ideas have been developed to reduce the number of NEETs. One of the main goals of the Connexions service, first piloted in 2001, is to reduce the number of NEETs. Most local authorities have made a local area agreement to this end. As part of the 2004 Spending Review, the Department for Education and Skills (DfES) had a public service agreement to reduce the proportion of NEETs from 9.6 percent in 2004 to 7.6 percent in 2010. Introduced in 2004–2005 the UK-wide Education Maintenance Allowance offers a means-tested weekly payment of up to £30 to young people continuing education past secondary school. In 2007 the government implemented a "September guarantee" that guaranteed all 16-year-old school leavers a suitable learning place in September, extended to 17-year-olds the following year. The "Young Person's Guarantee" was announced in the 2009 budget, offering a guaranteed job, training, or work experience to 18- to 24-year-olds who have been on Jobseeker's Allowance for six months; it went live on 25 January 2010. It was announced in the 2010 budget that the scheme would end in March 2012, an extension of one year. The Education and Skills Act 2008, which was granted royal assent in 2008, increased the school leaving age in England to 17 in 2013, and to 18 in 2015; the Act gives the National Assembly for Wales the option to raise the leaving age in that country. A number of further education colleges seek to enrol NEETs. For example, it was reported in 2005 that a course for NEETs at Bournemouth and Poole College had offered various sign-on incentives, and completion bonuses of a free iPod and £100 in cash.

The Scottish Government limits the NEET classification to those aged 16–19.

Japan

NEET is a distinct social policy category from that of freeter, the classification for those working low-wage part-time jobs, although in practice thousands of young people move between these categories (i.e., from the status of non-employed young person to that of a part-time worker and back) each year.

The demographic prevalence of NEETs has been indicated in employment statistics. Japanese politicians expressed concern about the impact on the economy of the growth in the NEET population. The estimated size rose from 480,000 in September 2002 to 520,000 in September 2003, according to the Japanese Ministry of Health, Labor and Welfare. Other surveys by the Japanese government in 2002 presented a much larger figure of 850,000 people who can be classified as NEET, of which 60% were people aged 25 to 34. It is therefore clear that the number of NEETs produced by statistics depends greatly on the specific definition adopted; hence all figures should be treated with caution.

When the NEET issue erupted in the Japanese media in 2004 and 2005, non-employed young people falling into this category were framed as lazy, work-shy, and voluntarily out of employment. This media portrayal was effective in arousing the concern of Japan's (conservative) middle aged population, but it led only to moderate support for new youth policies. Indeed, as argued by Toivonen in an empirical monograph that juxtaposes media and policy discourses with youth support practices, the most promising solutions to the NEET conundrum have been created by social entrepreneurs such as Kudo Kei and Iwamoto Mami rather than by MHLW policy-makers or even scholars.

Unlike most Western European countries, Japan's unemployment benefit terminates automatically after three to six months and there is a limited range of support for those with special needs. Many NEETs in Japan are thus inevitably supported by their parents or relatives, though some find their way to Youth Support Stations and other services designed and/or enacted by social enterprises, including many NPOs.

Australia 
A report by the OECD revealed that 580,000 young Australians fall under the classification. The report also revealed that the number of NEETs has soared by 10,000 since the Global Financial Crisis and now account for one in eight Australians between the ages of 15 and 29.

Canada
Statistics Canada carried out the first comprehensive study into the state of NEETs in Canada in 2012. It was revealed that around 13% of Canadians between the ages of 15 and 29 fell into the category. Despite the percentage being the second lowest in the G7 nations the total number of young Canadians that were classified as NEETs currently stands at 904,000. The study also revealed that out of the total 904,000 NEETs, around 513,000 were not looking actively for jobs. The study also suggested that long-term unemployment was not necessarily due to wider disenchantment with the labour market but rather arose out of varying factors. The study also revealed that 82% of the young people not in the labour force actually want to be placed in long-term employment. The study classified the Canadian NEET population not to be "in a high risk, negative state".

According to a Labour Force Survey by Statistics Canada, the proportion of NEETs in Canada rose to 24% in 2020, coinciding with the start of the COVID-19 pandemic.

Iberia and Latin America
In Spain, Mexico, Argentina, Chile and Uruguay, the term "ni-ni" ("neither-nor") has become a popular equivalent of NEET. The term means 'ni estudia, ni trabaja' ("neither studies, nor works"). In Portuguese there is the equivalent term "nem-nem".

The term has become a controversial topic in Mexico, where the government feels that people who might be considered NEET are more likely to choose to join the organizations involved in drug trafficking in order to sustain their economical and personal needs, than they are to get a job or study. Some states and organizations in Mexico are creating work programs and scholarships to keep the NEET population away from drug cartels.

In Latin American and the Caribbean, the World Bank estimates one in five people ages 15–24 are ninis, 20 million in total, an increase of 2 million since 1992. The 2016 study notes that two thirds of nini are women, mostly due to early marriage, teen pregnancy, or both. It is noted that male ninis increased by 46% since 1992; males account for the entire increase of ninis in the region. Male ninis usually dropped-out of school to work low-paying jobs, who during economic instability lost their jobs with little chance of returning to school.

In Mexico, ninis statistically account for at least a quarter of increased homicides in high-crime areas during 2007-2012, but in lower-crime areas there was no association between ninis and crime. The World Bank noted that as of 2010 in Latin America and the Caribbean, the number of ninis is somewhat lower than the global average though much higher than in higher-income nations. Globally, of the 260 million ninis counted in 2010 by the World Bank, the Middle East, North African and South Asian regions had the highest shares.

United States

Given the lasting effects caused by the Great Recession, publications such as Time have published articles discussing the number of Americans that have qualified as NEETs, with approximately 15% of Americans under the age of 25 qualifying as such during the first quarter of 2011. Journalist Peter Gumbel wrote in late 2012 that NEETs are "especially prevalent in the U.S." and constitute a "marginalized group of young people" given U.S. state and local government difficulties in maintaining social services.

NEET rates in OECD countries

See also
Compulsory education
Disconnected youth
Discouraged worker
Emerging adulthood
Ergophobia
Failure to launch
Hikikomori
Job guarantee
Refusal of work
Simultaneous recruiting of new graduates
Tang ping ("lying flat")
Waithood
Youth unemployment
Young night drifters

References

Sources
 . Scottish Executive. 2005. Accessed 25 August 2011.  25 August 2011. See HTML version.
 . Northern Ireland Assembly. 10 November 2009. Accessed 26 August 2011.
Children, Schools and Families Committee.  . The Stationery Office. 8 April 2010. Accessed 25 August 2011.  25 August 2011.

Further reading

"Children, Schools and Families Committee: Session 2009-10" . parliament.uk. Accessed 25 August 2011.
"Participation in Education, Training and Employment by 16-18 Year Olds in England". Department for Education. 22 June 2010. Accessed 25 August 2011.

"Employability Framework for Scotland: Report of the NEET Workstream" . Scottish Executive. June 2005. Accessed 25 August 2011.
Eason, Gary. "Neets are an unknown quantity" . BBC News. 5 November 2007. Accessed 26 August 2011.
Pemberton Simon. "Tackling the NEET generation and the ability of policy to generate a ‘NEET’ solution—evidence from the UK". Environment and Planning C: Government and Policy 26 (1): 243–259. 2008.
Passey, Don; Williams, Sadie; Rogers, Colin. "Assessing the potential of e-learning to support re-engagement amongst young people with Not in education, employment or training (NEET) status". Becta. April 2008. Accessed 25 August 2011.  25 August 2011.
 . Confederation of British Industry. October 2008. Accessed 25 August 2011.  25 August 2011. See webpage.
Off to a Good Start? Jobs for Youth. Organisation for Economic Co-operation and Development.
Richardson, Hannah. "Government 'to miss Neet target'" . BBC News. 26 February 2010. Accessed 26 August 2011.
"Against the odds" . Audit Commission. July 2010. Accessed 26 August 2011.
Roberts, Steven. "Beyond ‘NEET’ and ‘tidy’ pathways: considering the ‘missing middle’ of youth transition studies" . Journal of Youth Studies 14 (1): 21–39. 2011.

Japan
Inui, Akio. . Social Work and Society 3 (2): 244–251. 2005.
"Over 90% of People Have a Sense of Crisis Regarding the NEET Issue". Nomura Research Institute. 1 November 2004. Accessed 26 August 2011.
Nakamura, Akemi. "Being NEET not so neat for nation's youth". Japan Times. 19 June 2004. Accessed 26 August 2011.
Toivonen, Tuukka (University of Oxford) "‘Don't let your child become a NEET!’ The strategic foundations of a Japanese youth scare" . Japan Forum. 4 Oct 2011. Free access article.

External links
 

Unemployment
Refusal of work
Demographics